White Shoes & the Couples Company is an Indonesian pop band from Jakarta, Indonesia. The band are currently signed to both Indonesian label Aksara Records and American independent label Minty Fresh based in Chicago. Their music is influenced by Indonesian film soundtracks from the 1970s, 1930s jazz, disco, and 1960s pop music.

Overview
White Shoes & the Couples Company also known as WSATCC consists of Aprilia Apsari, Saleh, Yusmario Farabi, John Navid, Ricky Virgana, and Aprimela Prawidiyanti. Apsari and Farabi met each other while they were both studied at the fine art faculty in Institut Kesenian Jakarta (Jakarta Institute Of Arts). The two formed the band with their colleague, Saleh in 2002. In 2004, Ricky Virgana, John Navid and Aprimela Prawidiyanti  (Ricky Virgana’s wife) joined. The band came up with the name due to the fad of wearing white shoes at the school where they met. The band sings the majority of its songs in Indonesian.

In 2005, the band released their self-titled album on Aksara Records. In 2007, they released an EP titled Skenario Masa Muda in 2007. Eventually, the band was signed by Minty Fresh, and re-released their self-titled album for an international release. With Apsari’s vocals trilling in English and her home tongue and classical music instruments and phrasings (the eight-minute “Nothing to Fear”) standing out alongside groovy, bouncy nuggets like “Top Star” and “Brother John.” That blend has landed White Shoes & The Couples Company on nearly a half-dozen film soundtracks in its home country.

The band was honored by Rolling Stone as one of the best 25 bands on Myspace. They were also honored by AllMusic as one of the 25 most crushworthy bands of 2006.

Discography

Albums
 White Shoes & the Couples Company (2005)
 Album Vakansi (2010)
 2020 (2020)

EPs
Skenario Masa Muda (2007)
 Six Live Selection (2012)
 Menyanyikan Lagu-Lagu Daerah (2013)

Singles
"Senandung Maaf"
"Windu Defrina"
"Sunday Memory Lane"
"Tentang Cita"
"Aksi Kucing"
"Pelan Tapi Pasti"
"Senja Menggila"
"Vakansi"
"Irama Cita"
"Folklor"

Compilation/soundtrack appearances
Janji Joni film soundtrack (2005)
Riot (compilation of Thursday Riot) (2006)
Berbagi Suami film soundtrack (2006)
Mesin Waktu (compilation album)
Quickie Express film soundtrack (2007)

Band members
Aprilia Apsari (Miss Sari) – Main vocals
Ricky Virgana (Mr. Ricky) – Kontra Bass, Cello, Bass, Vocals
John Navid (Mr. John) – Drums, Vibes
Aprimela Prawidiyanti (Mrs. Mela) – Piano, Viola, Keyboards, Vocals
Saleh (Mr. Saleh) – Electric guitar, Vocals
Yusmario Farabi  (Mr. Rio) – Acoustic guitar, Vocals

See also
 List of Indonesian rock bands

References

External links
Official website
White Shoes & The Couples Company at MySpace
Some gigs photos

Musical groups established in 2002
Indie pop groups
Indonesian pop music groups
2002 establishments in Indonesia
Anugerah Musik Indonesia winners